World Religions is an educational television show which was produced and broadcast by TVOntario (known at the time as the Ontario Educational Communications Authority) in 1973. The show was based on the theological book, The World's Religions, written by Huston Smith.

Episode list
The three episode names known are:

 "Judaism"
 "Who Do Men Say That I Am?"
 "Islam:  Terrorists or Visionaries"
All episodes were 30 minutes in length.

TVO original programming
Religion in popular culture